The Night Coachman is a 1928 Soviet film directed by Georgi Tasin.

Plot 
The film takes place in Odessa during the Civil War. Cab driver Gordei informs his daughter Katia, as a result of which she is arrested.

Cast 
 Amvrosi Buchma as Gordej Yaroshchuk
 Maria Dyusimeter as Katia
 Nikolai Nademsky as Cossack
 Yu. Shumsky as Secret Police officer
 Karl Tomski as Boris

References

External links 

1928 films
1920s Russian-language films
Soviet silent feature films
Soviet black-and-white films